Oussama Benbot (born 11 October 1994) is an Algerian footballer who plays for USM Alger in the Algerian Ligue Professionnelle 1.

Career
In 2018, Oussama Benbot signed a contract with JS Kabylie.

In 2021, Oussama Benbot signed a contract with USM Alger.

References

External links
 

1994 births
Living people
Algerian footballers
Association football goalkeepers
JS Kabylie players
21st-century Algerian people